is a 227,200-square-meter mixed-use development in Chiyoda, Tokyo, Japan. Completed in 2016, it includes office, residential, commercial, hotel, and leisure space.

Tokyo Garden Terrace takes up 30,400 square meters previously occupied by the Grand Prince Hotel Akasaka, across the moat from Akasaka-mitsuke Station, and adjacent to the Hotel New Otani.

The primary developer is Seibu Properties working in concert with several partners. The project master design was created by architectural firm Kohn Pedersen Fox; Nikken Sekkei is the local architect of record.

Site History

The former Grand Prince Hotel Akasaka on the site was demolished in 2013. The original hotel structure designed by Kenzo Tange, was scheduled for closure at the end of March 2011, due to outdated building facilities and modifications in Tokyo building codes. In the wake of the 2011 Tōhoku earthquake and tsunami the hotel remained open and served as a temporary housing facility for evacuees from coastal regions of Fukushima Prefecture.

Buildings

Office and hotel tower
Tokyo Garden Terrace main tower provides 110,000 meters of office space and 28,700 meters of hotel accommodation in a 180m, 36-floor high-rise building. The Prince Gallery Kioichō, the hotel component, opened in July 2016. The hotel is located on floors 30 to 36 of the main tower and operated by Seibu Holdings as a franchise of The Luxury Collection.

Residential tower
A separate residential tower provides 22,700 meters of accommodation in a 90m, 21-floor high-rise tower.

Kitashirakawa Palace
The Kitashirakawa Palace has been refurbished as a banquet facility, known as Akasaka Prince Classic House. The historic structure was built in  the 1930s as the residence of Yi Un, the last crown prince of Korea.

See also
List of tallest buildings and structures in Tokyo

References

2016 establishments in Japan
Buildings and structures in Chiyoda, Tokyo
Hotel buildings completed in 2016
Kohn Pedersen Fox buildings
Office buildings completed in 2016
Residential skyscrapers in Tokyo
Retail buildings in Tokyo
Skyscraper hotels in Tokyo
Skyscraper office buildings in Tokyo